Gustaaf Deloor (24 June 1913 – 28 January 2002) was a Belgian road racing cyclist and the winner of the first two editions of the Vuelta a España in 1935 and 1936. The 1936 edition remains the longest winning finish time of the Vuelta in 150:07:54, the race consisted of 22 stages with a total length of 4,407 km. Gustaaf finished first and his older brother Alfons finished second overall.

Biography 
Deloor was professional from 1932 until 1939 when World War II caused the end of his career. Deloor was serving in the Belgian army at Fort Eben-Emael near Maastricht when the German army invaded the fort on 10 May 1940, but Deloor together with some 1,200 Belgians were taken prisoner. In Stalag II-B or the prisoner-of-war camp II-B,  Deloor was able to work in the kitchen due to a German officer that was interested in sports. When Deloor returned from the war, he came back to a plundered house and decided to start a new life in the United States of America in 1949. After ten years in New York he moved to Los Angeles. He worked as a mechanic until, in 1956, an affluent client helped him find a job at Cape Canaveral aerospace centre. Here he worked for the Marquardt Corporation, the aeronautical engineering firm, in the development and design of the ramjet engine for NASA  that was used on the Apollo 11 Saturn V rocket.  He lost his first wife in 1966 but remarried. In 1980, Deloor returned to Belgium.

Major results 

1935
 1st  Overall Vuelta a España
 1st Stages 3, 11 & 14
1936
 1st  Overall Vuelta a España
 1st Stages 2, 4 & 6
1937
 1st Stage 6 Tour de France
 2nd Liège–Bastogne–Liège

References

External links

Official Tour de France results for Gustaaf Deloor

1913 births
2002 deaths
Belgian male cyclists
Vuelta a España winners
Belgian Vuelta a España stage winners
Belgian Tour de France stage winners
Cyclists from East Flanders
Belgian military personnel of World War II
Belgian prisoners of war in World War II
People from Sint-Gillis-Waas